Chen Huiling (born 2 April 1971) is a Chinese former breaststroke swimmer who competed in the 1988 Summer Olympics.

References

1971 births
Living people
Chinese female breaststroke swimmers
Olympic swimmers of China
Swimmers at the 1988 Summer Olympics
20th-century Chinese women
21st-century Chinese women